Naradipati II (Arakanese:နရဓိပတိကြီး;  was a 37th king of the Mrauk-U Dynasty of Arakan.

References

Bibliography
 
 
 
 

Monarchs of Mrauk-U
18th century in Burma
18th-century Burmese monarchs